The name Arthur has been used for seven tropical cyclones in the Atlantic Ocean and  for three in the South Pacific Ocean.

In the Atlantic:
 Tropical Storm Arthur (1984), formed on August 28, very late for the first storm; moved over Newfoundland as an extratropical storm; no damages or casualties.
 Tropical Storm Arthur (1990), formed in the Caribbean, strengthened to near hurricane-strength, and dissipated.
 Tropical Storm Arthur (1996), struck North Carolina as a weak tropical storm.
 Tropical Storm Arthur (2002), weak tropical storm that didn't significantly affect land.
 Tropical Storm Arthur (2008), formed quickly just before moving inland in Belize on May 31.
 Hurricane Arthur (2014), a category 2 hurricane that formed near the northwestern Bahamas and made landfall in North Carolina, producing minimal damage. 
 Tropical Storm Arthur (2020), pre-season storm which neared North Carolina but moved out to sea before affecting Bermuda.

In the South Pacific:
 Cyclone Arthur (1981), did not affect land.
 Cyclone Wasa-Arthur (1991), Arthur formed from the remnants of Wasa, but was renamed.
 Cyclone Arthur (2007), formed in late January in the south Pacific Ocean briefly threatening the Cook Islands.

Atlantic hurricane set index articles
South Pacific cyclone set index articles